JAMA Pediatrics is a monthly peer-reviewed medical journal published by the American Medical Association. It covers all aspects of pediatrics. The journal was established in 1911 as the American Journal of Diseases of Children and renamed in 1994 to Archives of Pediatrics & Adolescent Medicine, before obtaining its current title in 2013.

The journal's founding editor-in-chief in 1911 was Abraham Jacobi. The articles in that first volume of the journal were mostly observational studies focused on the major causes of illness and death in children at the start of the 20th century.

The current editor-in-chief is Dimitri A. Christakis (University of Washington). According to Journal Citation Reports, the journal's 2021 impact factor is 26.796, ranking it 2nd out of 130 journals in the category "Pediatrics".

Naming history

Abstracting and indexing 
The journal is abstracted and indexed in Index Medicus/MEDLINE/PubMed.

See also
List of American Medical Association journals

References

External links

Pediatrics journals
Monthly journals
English-language journals
Publications established in 1911
American Medical Association academic journals